Quick, Before It Melts is a 1964 Panavision and Metrocolor comedy film directed by Delbert Mann, written by Dale Wasserman, starring Robert Morse, George Maharis, and Anjanette Comer and released by Metro-Goldwyn-Mayer. It was based on a novel of the same title by Philip Benjamin.

Plot
American magazine reporter Oliver Cannon gets an assignment to a naval expedition far from home by his boss, Harvey Sweigert, who is also the father of Oliver's fiancée, Sharon. He has never broken a big story, so Sweigert wants to see what kind of reporter he really is.

First stop is New Zealand, where photographer Pete Santelli, also along on the trip, quickly develops a romantic attraction to a local girl named Diana. And a half-Maori beauty named Tiare catches the interest of Oliver.

When the journalists move on to Antarctica, it becomes clear that a friendly Soviet citizen, Mikhail, whom they call Mickey, might be persuaded to defect. Women are invited to join the expedition, including Diana and Tiare, and the latter ends up falling in love with Mickey. Their romance and his defection is news, but a naval admiral tries to prevent Oliver from reporting his scoop to the world. Oliver shows what he's made of, then returns home to marry Sharon.

Cast
 Robert Morse as Oliver Cannon
 George Maharis as Pete Santelli
 Howard St. John as Harvey Sweigert
 Yvonne Craig as Sharon Sweigert
 Anjanette Comer as Tiare
 Janine Gray as Diana
 Michael Constantine as Mikhail
 James Gregory as the Admiral

External links
 
 
 

1964 films
1964 comedy films
American comedy films
Cold War films
Defection in fiction
Films about journalists
Films about the United States Navy
Films based on American novels
Films directed by Delbert Mann
Films scored by David Rose
Films set in Antarctica
Films set in New Zealand
Metro-Goldwyn-Mayer films
1960s English-language films
1960s American films